Mauricio Flores Rios (born September 10, 1990, in Valparaiso) is a Chilean chess player who holds the Grandmaster title. As of January 2015 he has a FIDE rating of 2531, is number 1 in Chile among active players.

In 2009 Mauricio Flores Rios moved to Brownsville, Texas after being recruited by the University of Texas at Brownsville. He played for UT Brownsville at the Final Four (President's Cup) of 2009, 2010 and 2011, as well as the Pan-American Intercollegiate of 2009-2012.

In 2015, Flores Rios published the book Chess Structures - a Grandmaster Guide, providing a study of the 28 most recurring pawn structures in chess practice.

Career
He played for Chile in three Chess Olympiads.
 In 2006, at fifth board in 37th Chess Olympiad in Turin (-2 +1 =1).
 In 2012, at third board in 40th Chess Olympiad in Istanbul (+3 -3 =2).
 In 2014, at second board, in 41st Chess Olympiad in Tromso(+3 -2 =4)

Titles 
 1st in the Pan American Sub 16 de Cuenca, Ecuador. (August 2006) 
 1st in the Pan American Sub 18 de Cordova, Argentina. (July 2008) 
 1st in Southwest Collegiate Championships (March 2009) 
 6th Continental Championship in São Paulo, Brazil. (August 2009)
 1st in US Class Chess Championship (2010) 
 1st in Montcada International Open, Spain. (July 2013)

Notable games
 Mauricio Flores vs Vladimir Burmakin, 2013, Slav Defense: General (D10), 1-0

References

External links 
 
 

1990 births
Living people
Chess grandmasters
Chilean chess players